Argyris Samios (born 2 January 1990) is a Greek footballer who plays as an attacking midfielder.

Career
Born in Athens, Samios began playing football for local side Panathinaikos F.C. He has played on loan for Egaleo F.C. in the Beta Ethniki and Olympiakos Chersonissos F.C. and Apollon Smyrni F.C. in the Gamma Ethniki.

References

External links
Profile at Myplayer.gr
Profile at Onsports.gr

1991 births
Living people
Association football defenders
Panathinaikos F.C. players
Ilisiakos F.C. players
Egaleo F.C. players
Apollon Smyrnis F.C. players
Proodeftiki F.C. players
Ethnikos Asteras F.C. players
Ethnikos Piraeus F.C. players
Footballers from Athens
Greek footballers